Kalaipuli G. Sekaran is an Indian film distributor, producer, director and actor who has worked in Tamil language films.

Career
G. Sekaran began his career as a film financier and distributor, before becoming a producer and a partner at Kalaipuli Films with S. Thanu and Soori. They debuted as producer with the film Yaar? (1985) by Kannan, with Sekaran portraying a negative role in the film. He subsequently moved on and worked on as a director in films including Oorai Therunjukitten (1988), Kaaval Poonaigal (1989) and Ulavaali (1994), before launching himself as a lead actor in Jameen Kottai (1995). He subsequently also played the lead role in Kudumba Sangili (1999). After that Sekaran went back to distributing films.

In the late 2000s, he became the chairman of the Distributors’ Council and represented the interest of distributors. In 2008, he directed a thriller called Kattuviriyan starring Malavika for which he also composed the music. In 2011, he worked on the production of a film titled Kallaparundhu, but the film did not have a theatrical release.

Filmography

As actor

References

Living people
Male actors in Tamil cinema
Indian male film actors
20th-century Indian film directors
Tamil film directors
Tamil screenwriters
Male actors from Tamil Nadu
Indian male screenwriters
Tamil film score composers
Year of birth missing (living people)